The lavender dancer (Argia hinei) is a damselfly of the family Coenagrionidae, native to the western United States from west Texas to southern California, as well as adjacent regions of northern Mexico.

References

External links
 Argia hinei profile and photo
 Argia hinei photos
 Argia hinei at AzOdes

Coenagrionidae
Insects described in 1918